Imidazoline receptors are the primary receptors on which clonidine and other imidazolines act. There are three main classes of imidazoline receptor: I1 is involved in inhibition of the sympathetic nervous system to lower blood pressure, I2 has as yet uncertain functions but is implicated in several psychiatric conditions, and I3 regulates insulin secretion.

Classes
As of 2017, there are three known subtypes of imidazoline receptors: I1, I2, and I3.

I1 receptor
The I1 receptor appears to be a G protein-coupled receptor that is localized on the plasma membrane. It may be coupled to PLA2 signalling and thus prostaglandin synthesis. In addition, activation inhibits the sodium-hydrogen antiporter and enzymes of catecholamine synthesis are induced, suggesting that the I1 receptor may belong to the neurocytokine receptor family, since its signaling pathways are similar to those of interleukins. It is found in the neurons of the reticular formation, the dorsomedial medulla oblongata, adrenal medulla, renal epithelium, pancreatic islets, platelets, and the prostate. They are notably not expressed in the cerebral cortex or locus coeruleus.

Animal research suggests that much of the antihypertensive action of imidazoline drugs such as clonidine is mediated by the I1 receptor. In addition, I1 receptor activation is used in ophthalmology to reduce intraocular pressure. Other putative functions include promoting Na+ excretion and promoting neural activity during hypoxia.

I2 receptor
The I2 receptor binding sites have been defined as being selective binding sites inhibited by the antagonist idazoxan that are not blocked by catecholamines. The major binding site is located on the outer mitochondrial membrane, and is proposed to be an allosteric site on monoamine oxidase, while another binding site has been found to be brain creatine kinase. Other known binding sites have yet to be characterized as of 2017.

Preliminary research in rodents suggests that I2 receptor agonists may be effective in chronic, but not acute pain, including fibromyalgia. I2 receptor activation has also been shown to decrease body temperature, potentially mediating neuroprotective effects seen in rats.

The only known antagonist for the receptor is idazoxan, which is non-selective.

I3 receptor
The I3 receptor regulates insulin secretion from pancreatic beta cells. It may be associated with ATP-sensitive K+ (KATP) channels.

Ligands

I1 receptors

Agonists
AGN 192403
Moxonidine

Antagonists

I2 receptors

Agonists
 CR-4056
 Phenyzoline (2-(2-phenylethyl)-4,5-dihydro-1H-imidazole)
 RS 45041-90
 Tracizoline

Antagonists
 BU 224 (disputed)

I3 receptors
No selective ligands are known as of 2017.

Nonselective ligands

Agonists
 Agmatine (putative endogenous ligand at I1; also interacts with NMDA, nicotinic, and α2 adrenoceptors)
 Apraclonidine (α2 adrenoceptor agonist)
 2-BFI (I2 agonist, NMDA antagonist)
 Cimetidine (I1 agonist, H2 receptor antagonist)
 Clonidine (I1 agonist, α2 adrenoceptor agonist)
 LNP-509
 LNP-911
 7-Me-marsanidine 
 Dimethyltryptamine
 mCPP
 Moxonidine
 Oxymetazoline (I1 agonist, α1 adrenoceptor agonist, α2 partial agonist)
 Rilmenidine
 S-23515
 S-23757
 Tizanidine

Antagonists
 BU99006  (alkylating agent, inactivates I2 receptors)
 Efaroxan (I1, α2 adrenoceptor antagonist)
 Idazoxan (I1, I2 antagonist, α2 adrenoceptor antagonist)

See also
 imidazoline
 NISCH

References

External links
 
 
 

Receptors